P. gouldii may refer to:
 Pectinaria gouldii, a worm species in the genus Pectinaria
 Phascolopsis gouldii, a sipunculid worm species in the genus Phascolopsis
 Pseudomys gouldii, the Gould's mouse, a mouse found in eastern inland Australia

See also
 Gouldii (disambiguation)